Samer Al Marta (born 1 July 1972) is a Kuwaiti footballer who is a defender for the Kuwaiti Premier League club Al Kuwait.

References

1972 births
Living people
Kuwaiti footballers
Sportspeople from Kuwait City
Association football defenders
AFC Cup winning players
Al Salmiya SC players
Kuwait SC players
Kuwait Premier League players
Kuwait international footballers